Richard Lemm (born 1946) is a poet and professor based in Prince Edward Island. He was born in Seattle, immigrated to Canada in 1967, and moved to Atlantic Canada in 1979. He has an MA in English from Queen's University and a PhD from Dalhousie University.

Richard has been teaching Canadian and Postcolonial literatures and Creative Writing at University of Prince Edward Island since 1986.

Publications

Poetry
Jeopardy: Poems. Charlottetown, PEI: Acorn, 2018.
The Gold Flash. North Vancouver, BC: Alfred Gustav Press, 2011.
Burning House. Hamilton, ON: Wolsak and Wynn, 2010.
Four Ways of Dealing with Bullies. Toronto, ON: Wolsak and Wynn, 2000.
Prelude to the Bacchanal. Charlottetown, PEI: Ragweed Press, 1990.
A Difficult Faith. Porters Lake, NS: Pottersfield Press, 1985.
Dancing in Asylum. Porters Lake, NS: Pottersfield Press, 1982.

Non-Fiction-Memoir
Imagined Truths: Myths from a Draft-Dodging Poet. Vancouver, BC: Tidewater Press, 2021.

Fiction
Shape of Things to Come. Charlottetown, PEI: Acorn, 2007.

Edited
Riptides: New Island Fiction. Charlottetown, PEI: Acorn, 2012.
Snow Softly Falling: Holiday Stories from Prince Edward Island. Charlottetown, PEI: Acorn, 2015.

Non-fiction-Biography
Milton Acorn: In Love and Anger. Ottawa, ON: Carleton University Press, 1999.

Awards

Winner of Canadian Authors’ Association Award 1991, for Prelude to the Bacchanal
Winner of P.E.I. Book Award 2014, for Shape of Things to Come
Shortlisted for Atlantic Poetry Prize 2003, for The Afterlife of Trees
Winner of the P.E.I. Heritage and Museum Foundation Award, for Milton Acorn: In Love and Anger
Winner of P.E.I. Book Award 2014, for Riptides: New Island Fiction
Shortlisted for Atlantic Book Award 2013, for Riptides: New Island Fiction

References

1946 births
Queen's University at Kingston alumni
Dalhousie University alumni
20th-century Canadian poets
21st-century Canadian poets
Canadian male poets
Academic staff of the University of Prince Edward Island
Living people
American emigrants to Canada